Ideopsis juventa, the wood nymph, gray glassy tiger or grey glassy tiger, is a species of nymphalid butterfly in the Danainae subfamily. It is found in Southeast Asia.

This butterfly is dark gray or black with two rows of circular white dots along the margins of its wings and  elongated white patches closer to the body. The elongated white patches appear to radiate from the thorax.

Life Cycle

Subspecies 
I. j. juventa (Java, Bali)
I. j. pseudosimilis van Eecke, 1915 (Sumatra, Bangka)
I. j. scrobia van Eecke, 1915 (Belitung)
I. j. sapana Talbot, 1943 (Kangean)
I. j. longa Doherty, 1891 (Enggano)
I. j. stictica Fruhstorfer, 1899 (Sumbawa)
I. j. phana Fruhstorfer, 1904 (Lombok)
I. j. kallatia Fruhstorfer, 1904 (Kalao)
I. j. lycosura Fruhstorfer, 1910 (Bonerate)
I. j. sitah (Fruhstorfer, 1904) (Natuna Islands, Islands on east coast of Malaya)
I. j. kinitis Fruhstorfer, 1904 (northern Borneo)
I. j. ishma Butler, 1869 (Sulawesi)
I. j. garia Fruhstorfer, 1904 (Philippines: Basilan)
I. j. manillana Moore, 1883 (Philippines: Luzon)
I. j. luzonica Moore, 1883 (Philippines: Babuyanes)
I. j. satellitica Fruhstorfer, 1899 (Selajar)
I. j. sophonisbe Fruhstorfer, 1904 (Sula Mangoli)
I. j. sequana Fruhstorfer, 1910 (Tukangbesi Islands)
I. j. tontoliensis (Fruhstorfer, 1897) (north-eastern Sulawesi)
I. j. lirungensis Fruhstorfer, 1899 (Talaud Islands)
I. j. curtisi Moore, 1883 (Halmahera, Ternate, Bachan)
I. j. ellida Fruhstorfer, 1904 (Obi)
I. j. meganire (Godart, 1819) (Buru, Ambon, Serang)
I. j. bosnika (Talbot, 1943) (Biak)
I. j. sobrina (Boisduval, 1832) (West Irian)
I. j. purpurata (Butler, 1866) (Salawati, Misool, Waigeu)
I. j. tanais (Fruhstorfer, 1904) (Geelvink Bay)
I. j. kolleri (Hulstaert, 1923) (West Irian)
I. j. hollandia (Talbot, 1943) (West Irian: Humboldt Bay)
I. j. metaxa Fruhstorfer, 1910 (Finschhafe, Huon Gulf, New Guinea)
I. j. eugenia (Fruhstorfer, 1907) (north-western New Guinea, Vulcan, Dampier, Rooke Islands)
I. j. georgina Fruhstorfer, 1904 (south-eastern Papua)
I. j. sobrinoides Butler, 1882 (Admiralty Islands to New Britain to New Ireland to the Solomon Islands)
I. j. zanira Fruhsorfer, 1904 (Maleita, Savo)

References 

Ideopsis
Butterflies of Borneo
Butterflies of Java
Butterflies described in 1777
Taxa named by Pieter Cramer